Havemann is a German surname. Notable people with the surname include:

Florian Havemann (born 1952), German writer, painter, composer and judge
Katja Havemann (born 1947), German activist and writer
Robert Havemann (1910–1982), East German chemist and dissident
Sara Hagemann (born 1979), Danish academic and expert on European politics

German-language surnames